Ivan Vrba (born 15 June 1977 in Zlín) is a Czech track cyclist. Vrba specialises in the sprint disciplines and won the bronze medal in keirin at the 2004 UCI Track Cycling World Championships.

Palmarès

External links 

1977 births
Living people
Cyclists at the 2000 Summer Olympics
Cyclists at the 2004 Summer Olympics
Czech male cyclists
Olympic cyclists of the Czech Republic
Sportspeople from Zlín
Czech track cyclists